Shiferaw Shigute (shefärawə shegut'ē) is an Ethiopian politician who was the Ethiopian Minister of Agriculture & Livestock, Minister of Education, President of the SNNPR,  and Chairman of the then SEPDM (Southern Ethiopian People's Democratic Movement), one of the parties that made up the current ruling Prosperity Party of Ethiopia (PB).

Career
Shiferaw has served in regional government of the SNNPR as departmental head in different sectors such as the Regional State Audit Bureau and the Capacity Building Coordination Bureau. He also served as Deputy-President of the region's government. Finally, before becoming the Minister of Education, he was President of the SNNPR for more than seven years. He served Minister of Education from 2013 to 2016, and served as President of the Southern Nations, Nationalities, and Peoples' Region from 2006 to 2013.

He has been serving as the Chairman of SEPDM, the ruling party in the SNNPR, until 25 June 2018 where he resigned from his role. He is Minister of Agriculture & Livestock. As Minister of Agriculture & Livestock since April 2018 he is a powerful minister in the government of the new Prime Minister Abiy Ahmed. His ministry, the Ministry of Agriculture & Livestock is a new large ministry in Ethiopia, which was formed from two smaller ministries, the Ministry of Agriculture & Natural Resources and the Ministry of Livestock & Fisheries in April 2018.

Education
Shiferaw Shigutie obtained a bachelor of art degree in Accounting from Civil Service College and received his master's degree in Organizational Leadership from the Azusa Pacific University in the United States.

References

Living people
Azusa Pacific University alumni
Ethiopian People's Revolutionary Democratic Front politicians
Government ministers of Ethiopia
Southern Ethiopian People's Democratic Movement politicians
People from Southern Nations, Nationalities, and Peoples' Region
Year of birth missing (living people)
21st-century Ethiopian politicians